Find the Lady is a 1976 comedy film directed by John Trent. It was one of the earliest films in which John Candy stars.  The plot involves kidnapping schemes all involving the same woman except the wrong woman gets taken and the right one runs away with her boyfriend.

The film is a spin-off of the earlier film It Seemed Like a Good Idea at the Time, which features the Kopek (Candy) and Broom (Lawrence Dane) characters in a subplot.

The cast also includes Ed McNamara, Hugh Webster, Delroy Lindo and Mickey Rooney.

Reception
The Calgary Herald wrote, "Find the Lady is a numbskull number about as funny as a slice of pizza in a hat... A British-Canadian co-production, Find the Lady stumbles from one worn-out comedy chestnut to another. There is the off-key opera singer, the transvestite who complains that life is a 'drag', lots of dumb blonds, and even dumber cops."

References

External links
 
 

1976 films
Canadian comedy films
English-language Canadian films
1976 comedy films
Films directed by John Trent (director)
1970s English-language films
1970s Canadian films